711 may refer to:

 711 (number), a natural number
 AD 711, a year of the 8th century AD
 711 BC, a year of the 8th century BC
 7-1-1, the telephone number of the Telecommunications Relay Service in the United States and Canada
 7-Eleven, a chain of convenience stores
 #711 (Quality Comics), a comics superhero
 George Washington's code number in the Revolutionary War Culper Ring
0711, the area code for Stuttgart in Baden-Württemberg, Germany

See also
 7-Eleven (disambiguation)